Markkanen is a Finnish surname. Notable people with the surname include:

Gregory Markkanen, American politician
Jussi Markkanen (born 1975), Finnish ice hockey goaltender
Matti Markkanen (1887–1942), Finnish gymnast
Mikko Markkanen (born 1977), Finnish hockey player
Väinö Markkanen (born 1929), Finnish sports shooter
 A family of Finnish sportspeople:
 Pekka Markkanen (born 1967), basketball player
 Eero Markkanen (born 1991), older son, footballer
 Lauri Markkanen (born 1997), younger son, basketball player

Finnish-language surnames